, born May 14, 1957 in the Chiba Prefecture, Japan, is a Japanese theatre and film actor. His roles most often consist of either father-type roles, or conversely, villain roles in police dramas and action movies. In the sho-gekijo theatre realm he is known for playing a wide variety of character roles.

Satoi is 183 cm tall, and his hobbies are basketball and rakugo "sit-down" comedy.

Filmography

Television
 Ariadne no Dangan (xxxx) (ep. 1)
 2nd House (xxxx) 
 Odoru Daisosasen 1 & 2 (xxxx) 
 101 proposals (xxxx) 
 Kita no Kuni Kara (xxxx) 
 Furuhata Ninzaburō (xxxx) 
 AIBOU: Tokyo Detective Duo (xxxx) 
 Trick (xxxx) 
 Idaten (2019)
 Mashin Sentai Kiramager (2020)
 Detective Yuri Rintaro (2020), Takehiko Yuasa (ep. 1)
 Reach Beyond the Blue Sky (2021), Hotta Masayoshi

Film
 The Cat Returns (2002) (Natori - voice)
 Iwane: Sword of Serenity (2019)
 Aristocrats (2021)

Notes

External links
 profile at www.siscompany.com

Actors from Chiba Prefecture
Living people
Japanese male film actors
Japanese male stage actors
Japanese male television actors
1957 births
20th-century Japanese male actors
21st-century Japanese male actors